Christopher Roy Robertshaw  is an English-born Manx politician who served as Member of the House of Keys for Douglas East until August 2021. He previously served as Deputy Speaker of the House of Keys, Minister of Social Care, Minister for Community, Culture and Leisure and Minister for Policy and Reform.

Early life
Robertshaw was born in 1948 in Chester, and is married with two children and five grandchildren.

He was schooled in a Roman Catholic seminary and served in the British Army in Libya, Cyprus, Germany, England and Norway. In 2005 he retired as Managing Director, Company Secretary and Registrar of Sefton Hotel Plc after a 35-year career in tourism. He is currently a director of the charity Kemmyrk and a member of the Douglas Regeneration Committee, of the Institute of Hospitality and of the Positive Action Group.

Political career
In 2010, he replaced Phil Braidwood as MHK for Douglas East in a by-election, and was re-elected at the 2011 and 2016 general elections.

In 2015, he resigned as Minister for Policy and Reform after less than a year in post, to be replaced by John Shimmin.

Among other issues, he has campaigned for the island's government to become a single legal entity (at present each department has its own legal identity).

Following re-election in 2016, Robertshaw stated publicly that he would not contest the next election in 2021.

Governmental positions
Minister for Policy and Reform, 2014-2015
Minister of Social Care, 2011–2014

Election results

2016

2011

2010

2006

References

1948 births
Living people
Members of the House of Keys 2011–2016
Members of the House of Keys 2016–2021